Trebitz is a village and a former municipality in Wittenberg district in Saxony-Anhalt, Germany. Since 1 July 2009, it is part of the town Bad Schmiedeberg.

Geography and transportation
Federal Highway (Bundesstraße) B 187 and the railway line between Wittenberg and Torgau run through the municipality.

Subdivisions
Besides Trebitz itself, the subdivisions of the municipality are Bösewig, Kleinzerbst and Österitz.

Sport 
The local MC Trebitz runs a motocross track.

External links 
 Düben  Heath Nature Park

Former municipalities in Saxony-Anhalt
Bad Schmiedeberg